Dor is a rural locality (a village) in Pudegskoye Rural Settlement, Vologodsky District, Vologda Oblast, Russia. The population was 2 as of 2002.

Geography 
The distance to Vologda is 32 km, to Striznevo is 9 km. Utkino, Opuchkovo, Yurchakovo are the nearest rural localities.

References 

Rural localities in Vologodsky District